Czerników may refer to the following places in Poland:

Czerników, Łódź Voivodeship
Czerników, West Pomeranian Voivodeship
Czerników Karski
Czerników Opatowski